The 49th Battalion (Edmonton Regiment), CEF, was an infantry battalion of the Canadian Expeditionary Force during the Great War.

History 
The 49th Battalion was authorized on 7 November 1914 and embarked for Great Britain on 3 June 1915. It disembarked in France on 9 October 1915, where it fought as part of the 7th Infantry Brigade, 3rd Canadian Division in France and Flanders until the end of the war. The battalion was disbanded on 15 September 1920.

The Battalion's newspaper, The Forty-Niner, was founded while the Battalion had not yet embarked for France and continued throughout the war.

The 49th Battalion recruited in and was mobilized at Edmonton, Alberta.

The 49th Battalion had four commanding officers:
Lieutenant-Colonel William Antrobus Griesbach, DSO, 4 June 1915 – 11 February 1917
Lieutenant-Colonel R.H. Palmer, DSO, 14 February 1917 – 1 July 1918
Lieutenant-Colonel C.Y. Weaver, DSO, 1 July 1918 – 1 October 1918
Lieutenant-Colonel R.H. Palmer, DSO, 2 October 1918 – demobilization

Two members of the 49th Battalion were awarded the Victoria Cross. Private John Chipman Kerr for his actions on 16 September 1916 at Courcelette, France and Private Cecil John Kinross for his actions on 30 October 1917 during the Battle of Passchendaele.

Battle Honours 
The 49th Battalion was awarded the following battle honours:
 
 
 Flers–Courcelette
 Ancre Heights
 
 Vimy, 1917
 
 Ypres, 1917
 Passchendaele
 
 Scarpe, 1918
 
 Canal du Nord

Perpetuation 
The 49th Battalion (Edmonton Regiment), CEF, is perpetuated by The Loyal Edmonton Regiment (4th Battalion, Princess Patricia's Canadian Light Infantry).

See also 

 List of infantry battalions in the Canadian Expeditionary Force

References

Sources

Canadian Expeditionary Force 1914–1919 by Col. G.W.L. Nicholson, CD, Queen's Printer, Ottawa, Ontario, 1962

Loyal Edmonton Regiment
049
Military units and formations of Alberta